Liliane Maigné (1 March 1928 – 20 December 2004) was a French actress.

Biography
Liliane Maigné was born 1 March 1928. Her father was André Maigné (1903–1936), her mother Madeleine Paroissien (1908–1983). She married Jean-Charles Tacchella in 1950. The couple had two children, and divorced 1956.

Filmography

 Le Corbeau (1943)
 Cecile Is Dead (1944)
 Au royaume des cieux (1949)
 Nous sommes toutes des assassins (1952)
 La fête à Henriette (1952)

Notes and references

External links
 

1928 births
2004 deaths
French film actresses
20th-century French women